The β-proteobacterial holin (BP-Hol) family (TC# 1.E.50) is a small family that includes members derived from a number of Burkholderia phage as well as a Poloromonas species. As of April 3, 2016, this family belongs to the Holin superfamily II. Members of Saier Bioinformatics Lab at University of California, San Diego found that the BP-Hol family is most closely related to the T7 holin family (TC# 1.E.6). These proteins are of 60 to 110 amino acyl residues (aas) in length and exhibit 1 or 2 transmembrane segments (TMSs). Some are annotated as type II hollins and may be related to members of the T7 Holin family (TC# 1.E.6), although BP-Hol proteins remain functionally uncharacterized. A representative list of the proteins belonging to the BP-Hol family can be found in the Transporter Classification Database.

See also 
 Holin
 Lysin
 Transporter Classification Database

Further reading 
 "BcepMigl_gp72 - Holin - Burkholderia phage BcepMigl - BcepMigl_gp72 gene & protein".www.uniprot.org. Retrieved 2016-03-29.
 Gründling, Angelika; Manson, Michael D.; Young, Ry (2001-07-31). "Holins kill without warning".Proceedings of the National Academy of Sciences 98 (16): 9348–9352. . . . .
 Preston, Gail M.; Studholme, David J.; Caldelari, Isabelle (2005-04-01). "Profiling the secretomes of plant pathogenic Proteobacteria". FEMS Microbiology Reviews 29 (2): 331–360. . . .
 Reddy, Bhaskara L.; Saier Jr., Milton H. (2013-11-01). "Topological and phylogenetic analyses of bacterial holin families and superfamilies". Biochimica et Biophysica Acta (BBA) - Biomembranes 1828 (11): 2654–2671.. . .
 Saier, Milton H.; Reddy, Bhaskara L. (2015-01-01). "Holins in Bacteria, Eukaryotes, and Archaea: Multifunctional Xenologues with Potential Biotechnological and Biomedical Applications". Journal of Bacteriology 197(1): 7–17. . . . .
 Wang, I. N.; Smith, D. L.; Young, R. (2000-01-01). "Holins: the protein clocks of bacteriophage infections". Annual Review of Microbiology 54: 799–825. . ..

References 

Protein families
Membrane proteins
Transmembrane proteins
Transmembrane transporters
Transport proteins
Integral membrane proteins
Holins